Constance M. Burge is an American television writer and producer. She is the creator of the television series Charmed (1998–2006) and the short-lived series Savannah (1996–1997). Burge was also a writer for Judging Amy, Ally McBeal and Boston Public, and has produced several other shows. In recent years, she has worked as a consulting producer and writer for Royal Pains (2009–2016), The Fosters (2016–2017) and Instinct (2018).

In 2000, Burge left her executive producer position on Charmed ahead of its third season after she reportedly became frustrated with the direction the storylines were going in for that season and because of disagreements with fellow executive producer Brad Kern. However, she remained on Charmed as an executive consultant until the fourth season.

Filmography

References

External links
 
 Constance M. Burge on TV.com

American soap opera writers
American television producers
American women television producers
Living people
American women television writers
Year of birth missing (living people)
Women soap opera writers
Place of birth missing (living people)
Charmed (TV series)
21st-century American women